Fortunato de Barros (17 April 1916 – 7 February 1985) was a Brazilian fencer. He competed in the individual and team épée events at the 1948 Summer Olympics.

References

External links
 

1916 births
1985 deaths
Brazilian male épée fencers
Olympic fencers of Brazil
Fencers at the 1948 Summer Olympics
20th-century Brazilian people